The Tomb of Ali Mardan Khan is a Mughal era tomb in the city of Lahore, Pakistan that was built in the 1630s.

Background
Ali Mardan Khan was a Kurd who first worked in the court of the Persian Safavid ruler Shah Safi, before moving to the Mughal court. The tomb is of octagonal plan.

He was experienced in the management of engineering works, especially the construction of canals, and worked on many large projects in the Mughal territories in modern Pakistan and Afghanistan. He was appointed as the governor of Kashmir, Lahore and Kabul, then of the Punjab in 1639.  Khan died in 1657 while going to Kashmir.

Though Khan was an engineer and courtier, he has come to be locally regarded as a notable spiritual figure, and locals call the tomb Mardan Khan's durbar (shrine). The grave is in a chamber below ground level, accessed by stairs, and has been decorated by visitors as though it were a saint's shrine.

Architecture

The tomb is now in a semi-ruined state, lacking its decorations, though the main structure is intact. There are kiosks around the top of the drum. The tomb stands on an octagonal podium, with each side  at the edge. It would have been originally decorated with stone facings and inlays (kashi kari), and fresco paintings, some traces of which remain on the tomb. The two storey gatehouse has retained much more of its decoration; originally there were perhaps four gateways. The tomb would have stood in the centre of a paradise garden as other Mughal tombs do.

Conservation
The tomb is surrounded by railway property, and located in Mughalpura road (which was earlier known as Vetman Road or Wheatman Road) which is from right from the Grand Trunk Road. Near the railway track on the road is a sign board where "MET-1" is written, beyond which lies the gate through which people can access the tomb, through a passageway.

Gallery

References 

Architecture of Lahore
Mughal tombs
Mughal gardens in Pakistan
Persian gardens in Pakistan
Tombs in Lahore